Axel Thue (19 February 1863 – 7 March 1922) was a Norwegian mathematician, known for his original work in diophantine approximation and combinatorics.

Work
Thue published his first important paper in 1909.

He stated in 1914 the so-called word problem for semigroups or Thue problem, closely related to the halting problem.

His only known PhD student was Thoralf Skolem.

The esoteric programming language Thue is named after him.

Publications

See also

References

External links
 
 Axel Thue private archive exists at NTNU University Library Dorabiblioteket

1863 births
1922 deaths
20th-century Norwegian mathematicians
Number theorists
People from Tønsberg